Parliamentary elections were held in Iraq on 20 October 1984. The elections were contested by 782 candidates, and saw the Ba'ath Party win 183 of the 250 seats.

Results

References

Elections in Iraq
Iraq
1984 elections in Iraq
October 1984 events in Asia
Election and referendum articles with incomplete results